The 2005 Ukrainian Super Cup became the second edition of Ukrainian Super Cup, an annual football match contested by the winners of the previous season's Ukrainian Top League and Ukrainian Cup competitions.

The match was played at the Central Stadium "Chornomorets", Odessa, on 9 July 2005, and contested by league winner Shakhtar Donetsk and cup winner Dynamo Kyiv. Shakhtar won on penalties 4–3 after the regular time ended in 1-1 draw.

Match

Details

Statistics

References

External links
 Second trophy of Lucescu in a month (Другий трофей Луческу за місяць). Champion (Ukrayinska Pravda). 9 July 2005
 Ukrainian Super Cup. "Dynamo" – "Shakhtar" 1:1 (pen. – 3:4). All ways lead to the SOUTH, or the place of meeting is impossible to change (Суперкубок Украины. "Динамо" - "Шахтер" 1:1 (по пенальти - 3:4). Все дороги ведут на ЮГ, или место встречи изменить нельзя). UA-Football. 9 July 2005.

2005
2005–06 in Ukrainian football
FC Dynamo Kyiv matches
FC Shakhtar Donetsk matches
Sport in Odesa
Ukrainian Super Cup 2005